Bailey Feltmate (born January 22, 1998) is a professional Canadian football linebacker for the Hamilton Tiger-Cats  of the Canadian Football League (CFL).

University career
Feltmate played U Sports football for the Acadia Axemen from 2016 to 2019. He played in 31 games over four seasons with the team where he had 203 tackles, 14 tackles for a loss, three sacks, and three forced fumbles. He won a Loney Bowl championship in 2017 and 2019 where he was also named a Second Team All-Canadian in both seasons.

Professional career
Feltmate was drafted in the second round, 17th overall by the Hamilton Tiger-Cats in the 2020 CFL Draft, but did not play in 2020 due to the cancellation of the 2020 CFL season. He then signed with the team on January 21, 2021. Feltmate made the team's active roster following training camp in 2021 and played in his first career professional game on August 5, 2021, against the Winnipeg Blue Bombers, where he had two special teams tackles. He played in all 14 regular season games and had one defensive tackle and 11 special teams tackles. He also played in all three post-season games that year, including his first Grey Cup game where he had three special teams tackles in a 108th Grey Cup loss to the Blue Bombers.

References

External links
 Hamilton Tiger-Cats bio

1998 births
Living people
Canadian football linebackers
Hamilton Tiger-Cats players
Players of Canadian football from New Brunswick
Sportspeople from Moncton
Acadia Axemen football players